is a professional Japanese baseball player. He plays pitcher for the Tokyo Yakult Swallows.

References 

1998 births
Living people
Baseball people from Tokyo
Japanese baseball players
Nippon Professional Baseball pitchers
Fukuoka SoftBank Hawks players
Tokyo Yakult Swallows players